2018 National Assembly elections were held in Nepal on 7 February 2018 across all seven provinces to form the first National Assembly since the adoption of the new constitution in 2015. According to Article 86 of the Constitution of Nepal 2015, the members of the National Assembly are elected every six years through an electoral college. In addition to this, one-third of the members are retired every two years for six years by drawing a lottery.

Electoral college 
The electoral college consists of members of the provincial assembly and Chairperson/Mayor and Vice Chairperson/Deputy Mayor of the local bodies within the state. Each provincial assembly members vote has a weight of forty eight whereas each Chairperson/Mayor/Vice Chairperson/Deputy Mayor vote has a weight of eighteen. The electoral college elects 56 members to the National Assembly and three members, including one woman, are nominated by the president on the recommendation of the Government of Nepal.

Results

Province No. 1

Province No. 2

Province No. 3

Province No. 4

Province No. 5

Province No. 6

Province No. 7

Nominated 
In addition to the elections, three members were nominated to the National Assembly on 20 February 2019.

 Bimala Poudel
 Ram Narayan Bidari
 Yuba Raj Khatiwada

References 

Elections in Nepal
2018 in Nepal